Jerusalem hospital may refer to:
the medieval hospice in Jerusalem rebuilt by the Knights Hospitaller, see Muristan
any hospital in Jerusalem, see List of hospitals in Israel#Jerusalem